The Wind of 666 Black Hearts is a compilation album by Norwegian black metal band Darkthrone. It was announced via Darkthrone's official Facebook page on October 22, 2016 and released on November 25, 2016. The album is a collection of demos recorded in 1991 and 1992 at the band's rehearsal space in Vinterbro, Norway. The demos would later develop into songs on the band's first and second black metal albums A Blaze in the Northern Sky and Under a Funeral Moon.

The album released as a double LP featuring extended liner notes by Fenriz and rare photos of the band.

Track listing

Personnel

Darkthrone 
 Nocturno Culto – lead guitar, bass guitar, vocals
 Zephyrous – lead and rhythm guitars
 Fenriz – drums 
 Dag Nilsen - bass guitar

References 

Darkthrone albums
2016 albums